The South Africa Sevens was played annually as part of the IRB Sevens World Series for international rugby sevens (seven-a-side version of rugby union). The 2010 competition was held on 10 December and 11 December at Outeniqua Park in George, Western Cape. It was the second of eight events in the 2010–11 IRB Sevens World Series.

This was the 12th edition of the South Africa Sevens, and also the ninth and last to be held in George. In April 2011, the South African Rugby Union announced that future editions of the tournament would be held at Nelson Mandela Bay Stadium in Port Elizabeth.

Format
The tournament consisted of four round-robin pools of four teams. All sixteen teams progressed to the knockout stage. The top two teams from each group progressed to quarter-finals in the main competition, with the winners of those quarter-finals competing in cup semi-finals and the losers competing in plate semi-finals. The bottom two teams from each group progressed to quarter-finals in the consolation competition, with the winners of those quarter-finals competing in bowl semi-finals and the losers competing in shield semi-finals.

Teams
These 16 teams were invited to participate in the 2010 tournament:

Pool stages

Pool A

Pool B

Pool C

Pool D

Knockout

Shield

Bowl

Plate

Cup

References

External links
 IRB Sevens
 South Africa Sevens on irb.com

South Africa
Sevens
South Africa Sevens